Anathallis attenuata is a species of orchid native to the Americas.

References 

attenuata
Plants described in 2001